Viktor Dzyuba (born August 10, 1977, Tula, Russia) is a Russian politician and a deputy of the 8th State Duma. In March 2006 he became a member of the United Russia. On March 14, 2010, he was elected deputy of the Tula City Duma of the 4th convocation. Four years later, he was re-elected for the 5th convocation. In 2016 he successfully ran for the 7th State Duma from the Tula constituency. In 2017, he became one of the 100 most influential people of the Tula oblast.

Since 2021, he has served as a deputy of the 8th State Duma.

References

1977 births
Living people
United Russia politicians
21st-century Russian politicians
Eighth convocation members of the State Duma (Russian Federation)